Barbara Boyd may refer to:

 Barbara Boyd (Ohio politician) (1942–2022)
 Barbara Boyd (Alabama politician) (born 1937)